Gábor Gellért Kis (20 October 1946 – 15 May 2013) was a Hungarian journalist, college professor and politician, member of the National Assembly (MP) for Monor (Pest County Constituency VII) between 1994 and 1998. He served as Chairman of the Committee on Human Rights, Minorities and Religious Affairs.

References

1946 births
2013 deaths
Hungarian journalists
Members of the Hungarian Socialist Workers' Party
Hungarian Socialist Party politicians
Members of the National Assembly of Hungary (1994–1998)
Writers from Budapest